Future Television (Televiziyon al-Mustaqbal) was a Lebanese free-to-air television station founded in 1993 by the Future Movement leader Rafik Hariri, a former Prime Minister of Lebanon. Future TV was also available via satellite in the Arab World, European Union, United States, Canada, and Australia. Politically, the channel supported the views of the Future Movement. The channel also had a sister channel, Future News, which is also defunct.

History
Future Television was a Lebanese owned and operated company founded in 1993. First launched in Lebanon on February 15, 1993, Future Television, although the youngest of the Lebanese stations back then, became the nation's fastest growing station.

In October 1994, Future Television started a trial satellite broadcasting over the footprint of Arabsat 1D. The testing period lasted two months. Shortly after, Future International was launched on the Arabsat 2A transponder.

In 1996, in compliance with the new Lebanese audio visual law, Future Television restructured its ownership. Future Television presently has around 90 new shareholders, all from the Lebanese business, social and media elite.

Future Television was forced into closing on May 9, during the 2008 Lebanon conflict. After moving its broadcasting headquarters, the station was back on the air on May 13 at 4:30 p.m (Lebanese Local Time). On May 16, the station went back to its original offices.

In September 2019, Lebanese Prime Minister Saad Hariri announced the suspension of work at his Future TV satellite television channel after 26 years of broadcasting, citing financial reasons for halting operations.

In a statement issued September 18 by his media office, Hariri said: “It is with a heavy heart that I announce today the decision to suspend work at Future TV and settle workers’ wages for the same financial reasons that led to the closing of Al-Mustaqbal newspaper. The decision was not an easy one for me or for the men and women of the Future Movement nor is it for the generation of the founding personnel and the millions of Lebanese and Arab viewers of Future TV who had stayed loyal to the station for more than a quarter of a century”.

The decision highlights the worsening financial crisis in which Hariri has been trapped since the dissolution of Saudi-Oger, his father's construction and services company in Saudi Arabia. The company had been the pillar of the Hariri family fortune.

Competitors 
The main and direct competitors of Future TV are Murr Television and Lebanese Broadcasting Corporation

Future Television brands 
 Future TV Terrestrial: A localized channel dedicated to the whole Lebanese family, it was broadcast in Digital television format from Doha since 2003.
 Future TV International: The channel is dedicated to Lebanese citizens in the Arab World & Europe.
 Future TV America & Australia: The channel is dedicated to Lebanese citizens in the Americas and Australia.

Defunct brands 
 Zein TV: This channel had programs aimed at a younger adult audience, with discussions and content relevant to Arab youth. Reasons for shutting down this channel remain unclear.
 Future News: This channel used to air news and political programs. The channel shut down on 20 August 2012 because the channel changed into a brand new version it was merged with the main future.

Popular programs
Future TV has produced many popular programs including SuperStar (Arabic version of Pop Idol), La Youmal لا يمل (a comedy/skit show), Miss Elite Top Model, El Halka Al-Ad'af (Arabic version of The Weakest Link), El Fakh (Arabic version of Cash Trapped), and Alakhbar (The News) which was usually broadcast daily at different times in Arabic, English, French, and even Armenian.

Its most famous talk show was Sireh wo infatahit سيرة وأنفتحت (Arabic for Open for Discussion) hosted by Zaven Kouyoumdjian. The show, which discussed various social and political issues, was thought to be the highest rating talk show in the Arab World.

Future TV's longest running show was Khaleek bill bait خليك بالبيت (Arabic for Stay at Home) hosted by Zahi Wehbe. The show interviewed artists and intellectuals from the Arab World. The show used to be co-hosted by Shahnaz Abdallah.

A show called "Transit" presented by talented anchor Najat Sharafeddine airing Sunday nights on Future Television was competing with a lot of other "Media Talk shows" aired on Lebanese and Middle Eastern TV corporations.

Logos

Future TV personalities

Past
Shahnaz Abdallah
Najwa Qassem
Joumana Nammour
Rima Maktabi

Present
Chef Chadi Zeitouni
Mahmoud Sammoura
Sahar El Khatib
Mounir Hafi
Zaven Kouyoumdjian
Zahi Wehbe
Salman Sarriyiddine
Lina Doughan
Najat Sharafeddin 
Youmna Tayyara  
Ali Hamade
Maya Zankoul
Nadim Koteich
Maria Fahel
Tal3at Feek

Affiliated Media

Al-Mustaqbal newspaper, also owned by the Hariri family, closed its print operations in January for similar reasons, thus threatening the survival of Hariri's Future Movement as a political project while Hezbollah's media empire remained very active despite the militant group's own financial woes.

References

External links

 

1993 establishments in Lebanon
Television channels and stations established in 1993
Television stations in Lebanon
International broadcasters
Mass media in Beirut
Companies based in Beirut
Arabic-language television stations